The following is a list of Lafayette Leopards football seasons for the football team that has represented Lafayette College.

Seasons

References

Lafayette Leopards
Lafayette Leopards football seasons